Gerald Hirschfeld, A.S.C. (25 April 1921 – 13 February 2017) was an American cinematographer.

Biography
Hirschfeld served at the Army Signal Corps Photographic Center during World War II as an assistant and operator for established Hollywood cinematographers including Leo Tover and Stanley Cortez. He started his Hollywood career in 1949 as a cinematographer for documentaries like Jack Arnold's With These Hands. During his life he has worked with directors like Sidney Lumet, John G. Avildsen, Frank Perry, Michael Crichton and Gene Wilder.

His most famous work is for Mel Brooks' Young Frankenstein: he shot the picture entirely in black-and-white, a rarity in the 1970s.

Selected filmography
 With These Hands (1950)
 Fail Safe (1964)
 Last Summer (1969)
 Goodbye, Columbus (1969)
 Diary of a Mad Housewife (1970)
 Doc (1971)
 Two People (1973)
 Summer Wishes, Winter Dreams (1973)
 The Affair (1973) 
 Young Frankenstein (1974)
 The Ultimate Warrior (1975)
 Two-Minute Warning (1976)
 The Car (1977)
 The World's Greatest Lover (1977)
 Coma (1978)
 Sunday Lovers (1980)
 Neighbors (1981)
 My Favorite Year (1982)
 To Be or Not to Be (1983)
 The House of God (1984)
 Head Office (1985)
 Malone (1986)

References

External links
 

American cinematographers
Artists from New York City
1921 births
2017 deaths
United States Army personnel of World War II